Weightlifting Fairy Kim Bok-joo is a 2016–2017 South Korean television series starring Lee Sung-kyung in the title role, with Nam Joo-hyuk. It is a coming-of-age sports drama, inspired by the life of Olympic gold-medalist Jang Mi-ran. It aired on MBC every Wednesday and Thursday at 22:00 (KST) from November 16, 2016, to January 11, 2017.

The series resonated with the young demographic; although it averaged 4.6% in audience share and received the lowest viewership ratings in its time-slot throughout its run, it gained a cult following among young viewers and received mostly favorable reviews.

Synopsis
Kim Bok joo (Lee Sung-Kyung), a young woman chasing her dream of weightlifting on an athletics college campus, develops a crush on her friend Jung Joon-Hyung's (Nam Joo-Hyuk) older brother, Jung Jae-Yi (Lee Jae-Yoon). At first, Joon Hyung teases her and goes along with her act, even helping her, but soon finds himself falling in love with her. This series is a coming-of-age story about a group of college athletes who are fighting for their dreams, experiencing and finding love in the process, and growing every step of the way.

Cast

Main
 Lee Sung-Kyung as Kim Bok-joo  
 A naturally gifted weightlifter with an ambitious and outgoing personality who attends a sports university. Growing up with her father who was a former weightlifter, she is inspired to follow in his footsteps. She stands up for herself and her friends. She does not hesitate to beat people up if they provoke her. She hides her insecurities and fragile heart under her strong exterior.  She at first experiences a one-sided love with Jung Jae-yi but later falls in love with his brother/cousin Jung Joon-hyung.
 Nam Joo-hyuk as Jung Joon-hyung 
He is a talented swimmer with a playful personality who attends the same university as Bok-joo.  He and Bok-joo were childhood friends when they were in elementary school. At first, when they meet again at the university, they do not recognize each other, until an incident occurs that refreshes their memories.  He is raised by his kind aunt and uncle after his mother leaves him behind and moves to Canada, where she starts a second family.  Joon-hyung suffers from trauma and during tournaments often suffers a panic attack and makes a false start leading to his getting disqualified. He enjoys teasing Bok-joo, but gradually falls in love with her.
 Lee Jae-yoon as Jung Jae-yi 
Joon-hyung's cousin and ersatz older brother, with a kind and gentle personality. A former athlete who becomes an obesity doctor due to an injury. He becomes Bok-joo's first love (without him realizing it) after he kindly lends her his umbrella on the street, even though at the time she is a complete stranger, and she enrolls in his obesity clinic so that she can meet him, although her need as a weightlifter is to put on weight rather than losing it. He treats Bok-joo like a younger sister and generally shows support to his brother's decision to like and date Bok-joo.
 Kyung Soo-jin as Song Shi-ho
Bok-joo's roommate and Joon-hyung's ex-girlfriend. She still has feelings for him and initially becomes jealous of his and Bok-joo's strong relationship, leading her to expose Bok-joo's secret trips to Jae-yi's clinic to Bok-joo's father and coaches at one point. After Bok-joo saves her life and sent her to the hospital on time, her relationship between her and Bok-joo and Joon-hyung gradually improves. She is a top-class rhythmic gymnast, who won a silver medal at the Asian Games at the age of eighteen, but she returns to the sports university due to a decline in her performance. Shi-ho is an overachiever and is under constant stress about her weight and skills, which led to her break-up with Joon-hyung, a psychiatric eating disorder and her acting rashly in various situations.

Supporting

Weightlifting team

 Cho Hye-jung as Jung Nan-hee, despite her strength is a very feminine girl who dreams of romance and always willing to spread happiness.
 Lee Joo-young as Lee Seon-ok, is direct, loves to eat, and does not show much affection but is loyal to her friends. She eventually "demonstrates" some potential interest in Tae-Kwon.
 Choi Moo-sung as Yoon Deok-man, Professor/Coach
 Jang Young-nam as Choi Sung-eun, Coach
 Oh Eui-shik as Bang Woon-ki, the Team Captain who had a newborn child with his girlfriend
 Lee Bit-na as Bitna, Bok-joo's junior
 Moon Ji-yoon as Sang Chul
 Jo Mi-nyeo
 Yoo Joon-hong
 Noh Yeong-joo
 Lee Ye-bin

Swimming team

 Ji Il-joo as Jo Tae-Kwon, the very friendly and silly roommate of Joon-hyung who eventually shows some interest in Seon-ok.
 Kim Jae-hyun as Kim Jae-hyun
 Kim Woo-hyuk as Kim Woo-hyuk
Joon-hyung's junior. He has a habit of dating women, then ghosting them, and thus is hated by all his female peers.
 Choi Woong as Kim Gi-seok
Joon-hyung's senior. He has a crush on Shi-ho and treats Joon-Hyung with a gruffer demeanor.
 Lee Ji-hoon
 Kim Nam-woo
 Kwon Hyuk-beom

Rhythmic gymnastics team

 Cho Soo-hyang as Soo-bin
A rising star collegiate rhythmic gymnast who competes with Shi-ho.
 Ray Yang as Sung Yoo-hwi, Coach
 Lee Seul
 Oh Ha-nee as Rhythmic gymnast	
 Kim Yoo-ji
 Jung Yoo-jin

People around Bok-joo 
 Ahn Gil-kang as Kim Chang-gul
Bok-joo's father, a former weightlifter who owns a fried chicken restaurant
 Kang Ki-young as Kim Dae-ho
Bok-joo's uncle, a part-time aspiring actor who works at the restaurant

People around Joon-hyung 
 Jung In-gi as Joon-hyung's paternal uncle and foster father
 Lee Jung-eun as Joon-hyung's paternal aunt and foster mother

Extended 

 Yoo Da-in as Go Ah-young
A doctor at the Hanwool College of Physical Education. She has a crush on Jae-yi.
 Park Won-sang as Psychotherapist
 Kim Yoon-ji
 Kim Chae-eun
 Kim Cha-kyung
 Seo Wang-seok
 Kim Hyun-jung as Dormitory's house mistress
 Jung Hyun-seok as Dormitory's house mistress
 Park Jung-min
 Park Gun-lak
 Lee Joon-hee
 Lee Suk-jin
 Lim Seo-jung
 Yoo Yeong-bin
 Lim Uk-jin
 Lim Geun-seo
 Jung Soo-in
 Seo Kwang-jae
 Choi Nam-wook
 Tae Won-seok
 Heo Min-kang
 Jeon Ji-ahn

Special appearances (Cameo)

 Yoon Jin-hee as Weightlifting contestant (Ep. 1)
 Kim Jae-hyun as Joonhyung's minion (Ep.2)
 Lee Jong-hwa as Choi Tae-hoon (Ep. 1, 15)
 Lee Soo-ji as Ku Seul (Ep. 1)
 Lee Jong-suk as Jong-suk, Chicken Restaurant Customer and archery athlete (Ep. 2)
 Yoon Yoo-sun as Kim Jung-yeon, Joon-hyung's biological mother (Ep. 6, 14–15)
 Shin A-young as announcer
 Ahn Il-kwon
 Noh Woo-jin
 Ji Hye-ran as Song Shi-eon, Shi-ho's sister (Ep. 8–9, 13)
 Ji Soo as Bok-joo's fellow worker (Ep. 11)
 Seohyun as Hwan-hee, Jae-yi's ex-girlfriend (Ep. 12)
 Min Sung-wook as Sang-goo (Ep. 12)
 Kim Seul-gi as Seul-gi, supermarket employee (Ep. 15)
 Byeon Woo-seok as Joon-Hyung's senior (Ep. 16)

Production 
The series is written by Yang Hee-seung of the 2015 romantic comedies Oh My Ghostess and High School King of Savvy; and directed by PD Oh Hyun-joong of 7th Grade Civil Servant. The first script reading took place in August 2016 at MBC broadcasting station in Sangam, Seoul, South Korea.

Original soundtrack

OST Part 1

OST Part 2

OST Part 3

OST Part 4

OST Part 5

OST Part 6

OST Part 7

OST Part 8

Ratings

Awards and nominations

Notes

References

External links
  

2016 South Korean television series debuts
2017 South Korean television series endings
2010s college television series
MBC TV television dramas
South Korean sports television series
South Korean romantic comedy television series
Television series by Chorokbaem Media
South Korean college television series